Lela Viola Barton (1901–1967) was an American botanist who specialized in seed germination and storage.

Early life
Lela Barton was born in Farmington, Washington County, Arkansas, on 14 November 1901, the third of five children born to Gaston Reuben and Mary Fannie (née Miller) Barton.

Career
Barton worked at the Boyce Thompson Institute for Plant Research at Yonkers, in New York City, specializing in seeds.

Death
Barton died aged 66 at Tucson, Arizona, on 31 July 1967; she was buried at Fairview Memorial Gardens, Fayetteville, Arkansas. She never married.

Publications
 - (1933). Seedling production of tree peony. Contrib. Boyce Thomp. Inst. 5. 451–460. 
 - (1939). Storage of elm seed. Contrib. Boyce Thomp. Inst. 10, 221–233.
 - (1936). Germination and seed production in Lilium sp. Contrib. Boyce Thomp. Inst. 8. 297–309.
 - (1939). Experiments at Boyce Thompson Institute on germination and dormancy in seeds. Sci. Hort. 7. 186–193. 
 - & Schroeder, E. M. (1941). Convellaria majalis L. and Silacina racemosa (L.) Desf. Contrib. Boyce Thomp. Inst. 12. 277–300.
 - (1943). The storage of citrus seed. Contrib. Boyce Thomp. Inst. 13, 47–55.
 - (1944). Some seeds showing special dormancy. Contrib. Boyce Thomp. Inst. 13. 259–271.
 - & Thornton, N. C. (1947). Germination and sex population studies of Ilex opaca Ait. Contrib. Boyce Thomp. Inst. 14. 405–410.
 - & Chandler, C. (1957). Physiological and morphological effects of gibberellic acid on epicotyl dormancy of tree peony. Contrib. Boyce Thomp. Inst. 19. 201–214.
 - (1960). Storage of seeds of Lobelia cardinalis. Contrib. Boyce Thomp. Inst. 395–401. 
 - (1961). Seed preservation and viability. Leonard Hill, London. 
 - (1965). Viability of seeds of Theobrama cacao L. Contrib. Boyce Thomp. Inst. 23. 109–122.
 - (1966a). Effects of temperature and moisture on viability of stored lettuce, onion, and tomato seed. Contrib. Boyce Thomp. Inst. 23. 285–290.
 - (1966b). Viability of Pyrethrum seeds. Contrib. Boyce Thomp. Inst. 23, 267–268.
 - (1967). Bibliography of Seeds. 858 p., Columbia University Press, New York. 
 - & Croker, W. (1990). Physiology of Seeds: An Introduction to the Experimental Study of Seed and Germination Problems. Bishen Singh Mahendrapal Singh, Dehradun 
 - (2005). Seeds: Their Preservation And Longevity. Asiatic Publishing House,

References

1901 births
1967 deaths
American women botanists
People from Washington County, Arkansas
20th-century American women scientists
20th-century American botanists